The Cree River is a river in northern Saskatchewan located in the Athabasca Basin of the Canadian Shield. The river flows north from Cree Lake to Black Lake. The river is part of the Mackenzie River drainage basin.

The river is bridged near its mouth south of Black Lake by Highway 905

Tributaries 
Timson River (left).
Little Cree River (right)
Rapid River (Cree River)

See also
List of rivers of Saskatchewan

References

External links 

Rivers of Saskatchewan